The following is a timeline of the history of the city of Troyes, France.

Prior to 14th century

 330–344 CE – Roman Catholic Diocese of Troyes established (approximate date).
 426 – Lupus of Troyes becomes bishop.
 9th C. – Abbey of Saint Loup, Troyes founded.
 867 – Religious Council held.
 878 – Religious Council held.
 892 – Troyes sacked by Norman forces.
 898 – Troyes sacked by Norman forces again.
 1107 – Religious Council held.
 1129 – Religious Council held.
 1152 – Henry I, Count of Champagne in power.
 1188 – Fire.
 1208 – Rebuilding of Troyes Cathedral begins.
 1242 - Theobald I of Navarre grants charters to the inhabitants.
 1262 – Basilica of St. Urbain, Troyes founded.

14th–19th centuries
 1304 – "Union of Champagne with the domains of the king of France."
 1359 –  (convent) construction begins.
 1380 – Public clock installed (approximate date).
 1419/25 - Troyes becomes temporary seat of government of Kingdom of France during the Hundred Years' War.
 1429 – July:  by forces of Dauphin of France Charles VII.
 ca.1500 - Population: 40,000. (approximate date)
 1508 –  (church) rebuilt.
 1518 – Plague.
 1524 – Fire destroys large part of city.
 1562 - Short occupation by Calvinist troops.
 1651 – Public library founded.
 1790 – Troyes becomes part of the Aube souveraineté.
 1793 – Population: 26,751.
 1798 –  founded.
 1801 – Cantons 1, 2, and 3 created.
 1830 – Journal de l'Aube newspaper in publication.
 1831 – Archaeology museum opens in the former Abbey of Saint Loup.
 1846 – Canal de la Haute-Seine opens.
 1861 – Cirque de Troyes built.
 1886 – Population: 46,972.
 1899 –  begins operating.

20th century

 1901 –  newspaper begins publication.
 1905 –  rebuilt.
 1906 - Population: 51,228.
 1911 – Population: 55,486.
 1912 – Gare de Troyes (train station) rebuilt.
 1925
 Stade de l'Aube (stadium) opens.
 Société archéologique du département de l'Aube founded.
 1931 –  (football club) formed.
 1933 – Troyes – Barberey Airport established.
 1945 – Regional  newspaper begins publication.
 1948 –  (museum) founded.
 1963 – Sauvegarde et Avenir de Troyes (preservation society) founded.
 1973 – Cantons 4, 5, 6, and 7 created.
 1982 – Musée d'art moderne de Troyes (museum) opens.
 1984 – Centre Troyen de Recherches et d'Études Pierre et Nicolas Pithou established.
 1986 – Troyes AC (football club) formed.
 1987 – Nogent Nuclear Power Plant commissioned in vicinity of Troyes.
 1988 –  festival begins.
 1993
  (shopping centre) in business.
 Agglomeration community  (regional government) created.
 1994 – University of Technology of Troyes established.
 1995 – François Baroin becomes mayor.

21st century

 2002 –  (library) opens.
 2009 – "" art exhibition held.
 2012 – Population: 60,009.
 2016 – Troyes becomes part of the Grand Est region.

See also
 Troyes history (fr)
 
 List of bishops of Troyes
 List of counts of Champagne
 
 Aube department history

Other cities in the Grand Est region:
 Timeline of Metz
 Timeline of Mulhouse
 Timeline of Nancy, France
 Timeline of Reims
 Timeline of Strasbourg

References

This article incorporates information from the French Wikipedia.

Bibliography

 
  v.2

External links

 Items related to Troyes, various dates (via Europeana)
 Items related to Troyes, various dates (via Digital Public Library of America)

Troyes
Troyes
troyes